The Zero Hour (aka Hollywood Radio Theater) was a 1973–74 American radio drama anthology series hosted by Rod Serling. With tales of mystery, adventure and suspense, the program was broadcast for two seasons. Some of the scripts were written by Serling.

The radio series debuted on September 3, 1973, in syndication, and was picked up by the Mutual Broadcasting System in December. The original format featured five-part dramas broadcast Monday through Friday with the story coming to a conclusion on Friday. Including commercials, each part was approximately 30 minutes long. Mutual affiliates were free to broadcast the series in any available time slot that they wished.

In 1974, still airing five days a week, the program changed to a full story in a single 30-minute installment with the same actor starring throughout the week in all five programs. That format was employed from late April 1974 to the end of the series in July 1974.

Producer J. M. Kholos was a Los Angeles advertising man who acquired the rights to suspense novels, including Tony Hillerman's The Blessing Way, for radio adaptations. In some cases, the titles were changed. For example, the five-part "Desperate Witness" was an adaptation of The Big Clock by Kenneth Fearing. To create a strong package, Kholos followed through by lining up top actors, including John Astin, Edgar Bergen, Joseph Campanella, Richard Crenna, John Dehner, Howard Duff, Keenan Wynn, Richard Deacon, Patty Duke, Nina Foch, George Maharis, Susan Oliver, Brock Peters and Lurene Tuttle.

The opening theme music was by Ferrante & Teicher. Don Hills produced the series for StudioHouse, which also produced the Salvation Army's Heartbeat Theatre. Counting each five-part show as five episodes, there were a total of 130 episodes. Failing to find a large audience due to the initial weekly serial format and lack of promotion, Mutual canceled the program,  and the final episode was broadcast on July 26 1974, though many Mutual affiliates continued broadcasting repeats for several months afterwards. According to director Elliott Lewis, "They wanted as much name value as possible to help with sales. They forgot they had to sell it. Everybody sat in the office and waited for someone to call them up and buy the show."

Highbridge Audio has released some of the five-part stories on audiocassettes.

Episodes  – Series One

Episodes – Series Two

References

External links
Jerry Haendiges Vintage Radio Logs: The Zero Hour
Rod Serling's ZERO HOUR PROMO PODCAST - Original audio promo for the series from 1973. [When accessed on February 22, 2017, this link was no longer active]
Libsyn podcasts First 6 programs; subsequent episodes appear by scrolling down on page.
History of Mutual radio's Zero Hour and Rod Serling
The Digital Deli Too
Glenhall Taylor: Before Television
Times Past Old Time Radio Opening description on this page above appears to come from this site.
Society to Preserve and Encourage Radio Drama, Variety, and Comedy Gus Bayes, sound man.

American radio dramas
1970s American radio programs
Mutual Broadcasting System programs
1974 radio dramas
Anthology radio series